is a Japanese figure skater who is now a coach. He won the three-time Japan Figure Skating Championships. He placed 18th in the 1968 Winter Olympic Games. He is the father of Takahiko Kozuka.

He is now an International Judge for Japan.

Results

See also 
Figure skating at the 1968 Winter Olympics

References

1946 births
Living people
Figure skaters at the 1968 Winter Olympics
Figure skating judges
Japanese male single skaters
Olympic figure skaters of Japan
Sportspeople from Aichi Prefecture